Dankia is a monotypical genus of flowering plants belonging to the family Theaceae.

Its native range is Indo-China.

Species:
 Dankia langbianensis Gagnep. 

Due to the small number of known specimen, it is not possible to describe characteristics of the group and its interactions with the ecossystem.

References

Theaceae
Ericales genera